Ulesie  is a small settlement in the administrative district of Gmina Janowo, within Nidzica County, Warmian-Masurian Voivodeship, in northern Poland.

The reason for the settlement being small is the decision to expand the Muszaki proving ground in this area. As a result only a small bit of the village is inhabited while older houses no longer exist. A similar thing happened with the nearby Puchałowo.

References

Ulesie